Established in 1982, the California Trolley and Railroad Corporation (CTRC) is a 501(c)(3) non-profit organization to preserve rail transportation in the Santa Clara Valley.

History

Streetcars 
California Trolley and Railroad Corporation (CTRC) was founded in 1982, after Santa Clara County Supervisor Rod Diridon Sr. attended the American Public Transit Association conference in Seattle and saw the operation of the city's historic Waterfront Streetcar. At the time, the county was planning its Guadalupe Corridor light rail line (now part of the VTA light rail system), and Diridon thought having historic rolling stock would create enthusiasm in the community for the line.

The Santa Clara Valley Transportation Authority (operator of the San Jose light rail system prior to the establishment of VTA) purchased three vintage streetcars and much of the restoration work took place at the History Park at Kelley Park.

"Historic Trolley" service in downtown San Jose began on November 18, 1988, and operated seven days a week (but not during rush hours or evenings).  Cars 73 and 124 (see table below) were available for use on this service during its early years, along with 129, which was similar to 124. Weekday service was discontinued in fall 1992, and in 1994 the schedule was cut from year-round service to summer months only, generally from Memorial Day weekend to Labor Day weekend. 

In 2004, the Historic Trolley service operated only during the Christmas and holiday season, and this pattern continued through 2008, and running Saturdays-only after 2004. Service was suspended entirely in 2009–2011 before resuming holiday-season-only service in 2012. In 2019, vintage trolley service known as the Holly Trolley was provided on Fridays, Saturdays and Sundays from December 6 to December 22, subject to cancellation during inclement weather (planned service on November 29–December 1 was cancelled because of rain). The Holly Trolley did not operate during December 2020 or 2021 due to the COVID-19 pandemic.

Ex-Melbourne & Metropolitan Tramways Board car 531 entered service in January 1990 and ex-Milan car 2001 in October 1992. Car 129 was sold to Sacramento Regional Transit in 1999.

The museum has its own operational trolley line, with rides given for free every weekend. In August 2009 the Corporation opened the Happy Hollow line extension allowing trolley service to the Japanese Friendship Garden and the Happy Hollow Zoo in Kelley Park.

Proposed museum 
In 1992, the CTRC received approval from the Santa Clara County Board of Supervisors to build the San Jose Steam Railroad Museum at the Santa Clara County Fairgrounds. The museum would be contained inside the former six-stall Lenzen Roundhouse and turntable which was built in 1899, damaged in the 1989 Loma Prieta earthquake and donated to the museum by Southern Pacific in 1994. Two locomotives were to be featured at the museum: Southern Pacific 2479, which was donated to the county in 1958 and was be restored for operation and Southern Pacific 1215 which was to be restored for static display.

In 2002, the Board of Supervisors rescinded their support for the museum at the fairgrounds. The CTRC would spend the next two decades attempting to find and purchase a suitable site for the proposed museum, including attempting to gather funds to buy land near the trolley barn at History Park. Southern Pacific 1215 was placed on display in History Park, but the larger museum never materialized.

On July 4, 2021, the CTRC reached an agreement to move the Lenzen Roundhouse, turntable, and Southern Pacific 2479 to the Niles Canyon Railway in nearby Alameda County.

Collection

References

External links

Organizations established in 1982
Rail transportation preservation in the United States
Organizations based in San Jose, California
History of Santa Clara County, California
Railroad museums in California
Historical societies in California
Museums in Santa Clara County, California
1982 establishments in California